Canéjan is a commune in the Gironde department in Nouvelle-Aquitaine in southwestern France.

Geography 
Canéjan is located 11.4 km southwest of Bordeaux. It is on the A63 autoroute, as well as the Route nationale 10.

The commune borders Cestas (southwest), Gradignan (northeast), Pessac (north), and Léognan (southeast).

History 
Gallo-Romans' relics has been discovered which attest human presence around the end of the 1st century and the beginning of the 2nd century.

On August 20, 1949, 29 people from Canéjan died at Le Puch (Cestas), while fighting a fire which killed 82 and burned 28,000 hectares (69,200 acres). In September 1949, General Charles de Gaulle came in Canéjan to visit firefighters' graves.

Name
There used to be two different ways of spelling the name of the city, Canéjean or Canéjan, in July 1987 it has been decided to keep only one: Canéjan.

Population

See also
Communes of the Gironde department

References

Communes of Gironde